"Welcome to Tomorrow (Are You Ready?)" is a song by German Eurodance group Snap!, released in September 1994 as the lead single from their third and final studio album, Welcome to Tomorrow (1994). It features vocals by American singer Summer (also known as Paula Brown) and reached number one in Finland. It was also a top-10 hit in Belgium, Denmark, Germany, Italy, the Netherlands, Spain and the UK. Its accompanying music video, made with Softimage 3D, took three months to finish.

Critical reception
Larry Flick from Billboard noted that this time, the act that has had hits with "The Power" and "Rhythm Is A Dancer" "jumps on the bandwagon with a track that fiddles with the formula by adding choral oohs and aahs to the background, as well as a line of racing, futuristic synths. This makes the single sound different enough to jump ahead of the increasingly crowded pack and score instant (and active) play." A reviewer from Manila Standard described it as "cyberpunk beat". Pan-European magazine Music & Media commented, "Does this title track to the new album reveal a new direction for the project that helped to define Euro dance? Gone are the heavy beats and the male rapper, but a female singer is still there." 

An editor, Robbert Tilli, wrote, "Smoother and even more melodic than anything they have done before, it is the first time a Snap single can happen on radio right "out of the box", and not as an aftermath to a giant sales hit based on club play." Alan Jones from Music Week said, "With a new singer and a new label, Snap have also updated their sound, curiously opting to move away from the harder dance arena to a more obvious pop sound. It has already lost them a lot of club support and they may struggle to match previous glories this time out." John Kilgo from The Network Forty felt that it "is everything you'd expect from Snap - and more. An upbeat dance number with an infectious groove". James Hamilton from the RM Dance Update deemed it a "new girl cooed very attractive but beat lacking lightweight 152.3bpm flyer".

Chart performance
"Welcome to Tomorrow (Are You Ready?)" was a major hit on the charts in Europe, peaking at number-one in Finland. It made it to the top 10 also in Belgium, Denmark, Germany, Italy, the Netherlands, Scotland, Spain and the UK, as well as on the Eurochart Hot 100, where the single reached number six in November 1994. On the UK Singles Chart, it peaked at number six in its eight week on the chart, on 30 October 1994. Additionally, "Welcome to Tomorrow (Are You Ready?)" climbed into the top 20 in Austria, Ireland and Switzerland, while peaking within the top 40 in Sweden. Outside Europe, it reached number 16 in Israel and number 125 in Australia. It was awarded with a silver record in the UK, with a sale of 200,000 singles.

Airplay
"Welcome To Tomorrow" entered the European airplay chart Border Breakers at number 16 on 3 September 1994 due to crossover airplay in West Central-, West-, North West-, North- and South-Europe. It peaked at the top on 29 October.

Music video

The accompanying music video for "Welcome to Tomorrow (Are You Ready?)" was directed by Angel. It was made as a 3-D science fiction fantasy, and it also features a small clip taken from the video of their 1990 hit "The Power".
 
3D graphics were produced with Softimage 3D by utilised by four graphic designers and animators through six Silicon Graphics computers. The 3D production lasted more than three months in addition to two-day programming and two-day live-action filming. The music video was released one week after the single release and radio airplay.

"Welcome to Tomorrow (Are You Ready?)" received heavy rotation on MTV Europe, power play on France's MCM and was A-listed on Germany's VIVA in October 1994.

Track listings

 7-inch (Ariola 74321 22385 7)
 "Welcome to Tomorrow" – 4:12
 "Welcome to Tomorrow" (7" Instrumental) – 4:12

 12-inch vinyl (Ariola 07822-12798-1)
 "Welcome to Tomorrow" (12" Long Edit) – 8:01
 "Welcome to Tomorrow" (B-Mix) – 6:32
 “Rame” (feat. Rukmani)  – 6:02

 CD single (BMG Bertelsmann Music Group 74321 22752 2 / Ariola 74321 22752 2)
 "Welcome to Tomorrow" – 4:12
 "Welcome to Tomorrow" (7" Instr. Ahahaa-Edit) – 4:12

 CD single (Ariola 74321 22385)
 "Welcome to Tomorrow" – 4:12
 "Welcome to Tomorrow" (5" Instr. Ahahaa Edit) – 6:20
 "Welcome to Tomorrow" (Are You Ready?) (B-Mix) – 6:32

 CD maxi (Ariola 74321 22385 2 (BMG) / EAN 0743212238525)
 "Welcome to Tomorrow" (Radio Edit) – 4:12
 "Welcome to Tomorrow" (5" Instrumental Ahahaa Edit) – 6:20
 "Welcome to Tomorrow" (B-Mix) – 6:32

Charts

Weekly charts

Year-end charts

Certifications

Release history

See also
 List of number-one singles of 1994 (Finland)

References

1994 singles
1994 songs
Ariola Records singles
Arista Records singles
Music videos directed by Angel (director)
Number-one singles in Finland
Snap! songs